One Hundred Years of Mormonism is a 1913 film depicting the early history of the Church of Jesus Christ of Latter-day Saints. The six-reel film took its title from the 1905 book by Mormon educator John Henry Evans. Ellaye Motion Picture Company was originally contracted by the church's leadership to produce the film, but the company broke its contract and was replaced by the Utah Moving Picture Company, with prominent screenwriter Nell Shipman completing the screenplay for a then-unprecedented fee of $2,500. Filming took place on locations across California and Utah. The filming locations in Utah were Salt Lake City, Daniel's Pass, and Heber.

The film premiered at the Salt Lake Theater in Salt Lake City, Utah, on February 3, 1913. Although church apostle James E. Talmage would later write that the film contained "many crudities and historical inaccuracies," it was well received by Mormon audiences.

No print of the film is known to survive and it is now considered to be a lost film.

See also

 LDS cinema
 LDS movies

References

External links
 
 

1913 drama films
1913 in Christianity
1913 films
Silent American drama films
American silent feature films
Films produced by the Church of Jesus Christ of Latter-day Saints
Lost American films
American black-and-white films
Films shot in Utah
Utah Moving Picture Company films
Films directed by Norval MacGregor
1913 lost films
Lost drama films
1910s American films
Silent horror films